The 1975 U.S. Clay Court Championships was a combined men's and women's Grand Prix tennis tournament held in Indianapolis in the United States and played on outdoor clay courts. It was the seventh edition of the tournament and was held from August 4 through August 11, 1975. Third-seeded Manuel Orantes won the men's singles title and the accompanying $16,000 first prize money while Chris Evert won the women's singles title.

Finals

Men's singles

 Manuel Orantes defeated  Arthur Ashe 6–2, 6–2
 It was Orantes' 6th title of the year and the 17th of his career.

Women's singles

 Chris Evert defeated  Dianne Fromholtz 6–3, 6–4
 It was Evert's 9th singles title of the year and the 48th of her career.

Men's doubles

 Juan Gisbert /  Manuel Orantes defeated  Wojciech Fibak /  Hans-Jürgen Pohmann 7–5, 6–0

Women's doubles

 Fiorella Bonicelli /  Isabel Fernández defeated  Gail Chanfreau /  Julie Heldman 3–6, 7–5, 6–3

References

External links
 ITF tournament edition details

 
U.S. Clay Court Championships
U.S. Clay Court Championships
U.S. Clay Court Championships
U.S. Clay Court Championships
U.S. Clay Court Championships